Johann Christian Hermenegild Joseph Franz de Paula Benjamin von Stramberg (13 October 1785 – 20 July 1868), commonly known as Johann Christian von Stramberg or Christian von Stramberg was a German historian.

He was born in Koblenz. He is best known as author of the 39-volume Rheinischer Antiquarius (1845–1871), with five of its volumes being issued after his death by Anton Joseph Weidenbach.

Sources 
  http://de.wikisource.org/wiki/ADB:Stramberg,_Johann_Christian_von

1785 births
1868 deaths
19th-century German historians
Writers from Koblenz
German male non-fiction writers